Aceves is a Spanish surname. Notable people with the surname include:

 Alfredo Aceves (born 1982), Mexican baseball player
 Carlos Humberto Aceves (born 1940), Mexican union leader and politician
 Daniel Aceves (born 1964), Mexican sport wrestler
 Fernando Aceves Humana (born 1969), Mexican painter
 Gilberto Aceves Navarro (born 1931), Mexican painter and sculptor
 Gustavo Aceves (born 1931), Mexican artist
 Jaime Aceves Pérez (born 1961), Mexican politician and from 2000 to 2003 Deputy of the Legislature of the Mexican Congress
 Jesús Aceves, Mexican sideshow performer
 Luis Aceves Castañeda (1913–1973), Mexican film actor
 Mauricio Aceves (born 1960), Mexican boxer
 Miguel Aceves Mejía (1915–2006), Mexican actor, composer and singer
 Rafael Aceves y Lozano (1837–1876), Spanish composer
 Roberto Aceves (born 1962), Mexican wrestler

References 

Spanish-language surnames